Janne Dahl (28 December 1882 – 18 December 1961) was a Swedish track and field athlete who competed in the 1912 Summer Olympics, held in Stockholm, where he finished 15th in the men's javelin throw.

References

External links
Profile

1882 births
1961 deaths
Athletes (track and field) at the 1912 Summer Olympics
Olympic athletes of Sweden
Swedish male javelin throwers